"It's Gonna Take a Miracle" is a song written by Teddy Randazzo, Bobby Weinstein, and Lou Stallman. It was first an R&B hit in 1965 for The Royalettes, which reached the Top 30 on the U.S. R&B chart and peaked at number 41 on the Billboard Hot 100 and number 37 on Cash Box.

The most successful version of "It's Gonna Take a Miracle" was the 1982 cover by R&B and gospel singer Deniece Williams. Her version went to number one on the R&B chart for two weeks and reached number ten on the Billboard Hot 100.

The song was originally written and intended for Little Anthony and The Imperials, but they never recorded it due to a royalty dispute with the song's writers/label owners Teddy Randazzo and Don Costa at the group's record label, DCP (Don Costa Productions) Records. Imperials member (and Double Rock and Roll Hall of Fame Inductee) Sammy Strain recalls:"We had a lot of hit records (with DCP) but we hadn’t received any royalties,” said Strain. “We protested and said we’re not going into the studio anymore until we get an accounting. We didn’t record for about eight or nine months. In the interim, Teddy Randazzo produced a girl group out of Baltimore called the Royalettes. He gave them a song called 'It’s Gonna Take a Miracle' which was written for Little Anthony & the Imperials. When it first came out, everybody thought it was us. He also produced Derek Martin who had a hit called 'You Better Go.' But we missed a million seller with 'Gonna Take a Miracle' when we went on strike with the record company."

Charts

Weekly charts

Year-end charts

Other cover versions
 In 1970, Alton Ellis recorded the song for his album Sunday Coming.
 In 1971, Laura Nyro recorded the song for her covers album with LaBelle, Gonna Take a Miracle. Nyro's recording featured in the film "A Home at the End of the World" (2004).
 In 1994, The Manhattan Transfer recorded a version with Bette Midler on lead vocals. This was released in 1995 on Manhattan Transfer's Tonin'.

References

External links
 
 

1965 singles
1982 singles
Bette Midler songs
Labelle songs
Deniece Williams songs
Songs written by Teddy Randazzo
Songs written by Bobby Weinstein
Songs written by Lou Stallman
1965 songs
MGM Records singles
Columbia Records singles
1960s ballads
Pop ballads